Presenting Ernie Henry is the debut album by American jazz saxophonist Ernie Henry featuring tracks recorded in 1956 for the Riverside label.

Reception

Allmusic awarded the album 4 stars with Scott Yanow stating "Altoist Ernie Henry's first of three sessions as a leader, all of which were made within 16 months of his premature death, served as a strong debut... Throughout the date, Henry hints strongly at the great potential he had".

Track listing
All compositions by Ernie Henry except as indicated
 "Gone with the Wind" (Herb Magidson, Allie Wrubel) - 3:24    
 "Orient" - 5:10    
 "Free Flight" - 5:48    
 "Checkmate" - 5:55    
 "Active Ingredients" - 5:03    
 "I Should Care" (Sammy Cahn, Axel Stordahl, Paul Weston) - 5:07    
 "Cleo's Chant" - 8:21  
Recorded at Reeves Sound Studios in New York City on August 23 (tracks 1-4) and August 30 (tracks 5-7), 1956

Personnel 
Ernie Henry - alto saxophone
Kenny Dorham - trumpet
Kenny Drew - piano
Wilbur Ware - bass
Art Taylor - drums

References 

1956 debut albums
Ernie Henry albums
Albums produced by Orrin Keepnews
Riverside Records albums